A vale is a type of valley.

Vale may also refer to:

Places

Georgia
 Vale, Georgia, a town in the Samtskhe-Javakheti region

Norway
 Våle, a historic municipality

Portugal
 Vale (Santa Maria da Feira), a former civil parish in the municipality of Santa Maria da Feira

Romania
 Vale, a village in Aluniş Commune, Cluj County
 Vale, a village in Toplița city, Harghita County
 Vale, a village in Săliște town, Sibiu County

United Kingdom
 Vale, Guernsey, a parish in Guernsey
 Vale of Glamorgan, a county borough in South Wales, commonly referred to as "The Vale"
 Vale of Leven, an area of West Dunbartonshire, Scotland, also knownas "The Vale"

United States
 Vale, Avery County, North Carolina
 Vail, Colorado
 Vale, Lincoln County, North Carolina
 Vale, Oregon
 Vale, South Dakota
 Vale, West Virginia
 Vale Summit, Maryland
 Vale Township, Butte County, South Dakota
 Vale Tunnel, Raytown, Missouri
 Lyman Estate, known as "The Vale", Waltham, Massachusetts

Languages
 Vale language, a minor Sudanic language 
 Vale languages or "Ruto-Vale", a group of languages
 Central Vale language, a minor Central Sudanic language
Vale, Latin for farewell in the Latin phrase Ave atque vale, formerly used as an alternative abbreviation before an obituary (as in obit)

People
 Vale (surname), including a list of people with the name
 Vale P. Thielman, American politician
 Short form of the Italian given name Valentina

Transportation
 HNoMS Vale, warships of the Royal Norwegian Navy
 Vale Special, a British sports car

Other uses
 Vale (album), a January Black Veil Brides album
 Vale, a 2008 Orden Ogan album
 Vale (company), a Brazilian mining company
 Vale gas field, a North Sea gas field
 The home town for the protagonists in the Nintendo game series Golden Sun
 Vale, the primary setting of the RoosterTeeth animated series RWBY

See also
 
 Val (disambiguation)
 Vail (disambiguation)
 Vallier
 Vallières (disambiguation)
 Veil (disambiguation)